Sphallotrichus setosus is a species of beetle in the family Cerambycidae. It was described by Ernst Friedrich Germar in 1824. It is known from southeastern Brazil, Paraguay, and Argentina.

References

Cerambycini
Beetles described in 1824